The Central Committee of the 17th Congress of the All-Union Communist Party (Bolsheviks) sat from 10 February 1934 until the convening of the 18th Congress on 10 March 1939. Its 1st Plenary Session elected the Politburo, Secretariat and Orgburo. The 17th Congress was labelled the "Congress of Victors" to mark the success of the first five-year plan and the collectivization of agriculture. The CC 1st Plenary Session elected Joseph Stalin General Secretary of the Central Committee, and Lazar Kaganovich continued to serve as Stalin's deputy, an informal post referred to by Sovietologists as Second Secretary, and was empowered to manage party business and sign Politburo resolutions when Stalin was away from Moscow.

This Central Committee composition saw the de-formalisation of politics; for example, the number of Politburo meetings was reduced to 16 for the year of 1934. Politburo decisions were made either by polling the members or informal meeting between Stalin and other Politburo members. According to Ukrainian historian Oleg Khlevniuk the "procedures followed by the Politburo became increasingly simplified as it was transformed from a collective body into an appendage of a decision-making system that rested on Stalin's sole authority. According to Vadim Rogovin, "During the period of the Great Purge, the rights of the Central Committee and its members were restricted even more", noting that CC members lost the right to attend Politburo sessions or being informed on the decisions taken by the Politburo, Secretariat or the Orgburo. When looking back, Nikita Khrushchev lamented the situation; "by 1938, the earlier democracy in the Central Committee had already been greatly undermined. For instance, as a candidate member of the Politburo, I did not receive materials of our sessions. ... I received only the material which Stalin sent to me on his own orders."

Of the 139 full members and candidate members elected at the 17th Party Congress, 98 people were killed in the period 1936–1940. Of these 44 (out of 71) were full members, while 55 (out of 68) were candidate members. Of those arrested, over 80 percent of them were below the age of 50. When the 18th Party Congress convened in 1939, 31 individuals remained in the Central Committee. Of these, seven were not reelected, and of them five were pensioned or relieved of leading offices (Grigory Petrovsky, Gleb Krzhizhanovsky, Grigory Broydo, Mikhail Chuvyrin and Isaak Schwartz) while Tikhon Yurkin and Avraami Zavenyagin were reelected to the CC at the 19th Party Congress (in 1952) and the 20th Party Congress (in 1956) respectively. Of the 24 reelected at the 18th Party Congress, four would be subject to violent repression (Mikhail Kaganovich in 1941, Solomon Lozovsky in 1952, Lavrentiy Beria in 1953 and Mir Jafar Baghirov in 1956). Klavdiya Nikolayeva became the only CC member who had previously been active in intra-party opposition to survive the purge.

When asked in an interview how the Central Committee approved its own destruction (the decision to expel a member from the CC or for a member to be arrested by the authorities had to be approved by the CC itself through a plenary session), Vyacheslav Molotov replied; "In the first place, on democratic centralism—Listen, it did not happen that a minority expelled a majority. It happened gradually. Seventy expelled 10–15 people, then 60 expelled another 15. All in line with majority and minority. ... Essentially, it happened that a minority of the composition of the TsK [CC] remained of this majority, but without formal violation [of democratic centralism]." According to J. Arch Getty and Oleg Naumov the CC "In the name of party unity and with a desperate feeling of corporate self-preservation, the nomenklatura committed suicide." However, there were some within the CC who breached party tradition and spoke against the purges, such as Grigory Kaminsky and Osip Piatnitsky for example.

Plenums
The CC was not a permanent institution. The CC was convened for fourteen plenary sessions between the 17th Congress and the 18th Congress. When the CC was not in session, decision-making powers were transferred to inner bodies of the CC itself; the Politburo, Secretariat and Orgburo (none of these bodies were permanent either, but convened to decide on crucial matters).

Apparatus
Individuals employed by Central Committee's bureaus, departments and newspapers made up the apparatus between the 17th Congress and the 18th Congress. The bureaus and departments were supervised by the Secretariat, and each secretary (member of the Secretariat) supervised a specific department. The leaders of departments were officially referred to as Heads, while the titles of bureau leaders varied between chairman, first secretary and secretary.

Composition

Members

Candidates

References

Citations

Bibliography

 

Central Committee of the Communist Party of the Soviet Union
1934 establishments in the Soviet Union
1939 disestablishments in the Soviet Union